Oppo is a Chinese smartphone manufacturer, one of the largest smartphone manufacturers in the world.

Oppo or OPPO may also refer to:

People 
 Cipriano Efisio Oppo (1891–1962), Italian painter
 Franco Oppo (1935–2016), Italian composer
 Stefano Oppo (born 1994), Italian Olympic rower
 Lidia Oppo (born 1995), Italian basketball player

Other uses
 Oppo Digital, an independently operated overseas division of BBK Electronics (parent of Oppo), manufacturing audio and video equipment
 Opposition research, a term used in political campaigning
 Opposite field, a term used in baseball
 Opposite lock